William Alfred Crawford (8 May 1872 – 1955) was an English professional footballer who played as an inside forward.

References

1872 births
1955 deaths
Footballers from Darlington
English footballers
Association football inside forwards
Stockton F.C. players
Grimsby Town F.C. players
English Football League players